The 2003 Meghalaya Legislative Assembly election was held on 26 February 2003.  The north-east Indian state's seventh Legislative Assembly election saw major changes with 28 sitting members and two former Chief Ministers losing their seats. The election also produced the largest representation for the national parties (Indian National Congress INC, the Nationalist Congress Party NCP and the Bharatiya Janata Party BJP) and, to that point, the smallest representation for the regional parties. No party won a majority of seats and despite more than a five percent loss in the popular vote compared to the 1998 election, the INC secured a plurality. Initially, the NCP under leader E. D. Marak attempted to form a government, but failed to secure support for a majority. Subsequently, D. D. Lapang was invited by Governor M. M. Jacob to present a majority, which was successfully achieved through the formation of the Meghalaya Democratic Alliance (MDA) coalition. Made up of 42 members of the Legislative Assembly (MLAs), the MDA consisted of the INC, the United Democratic Party (UDP), the Meghalaya Democratic Party (MDP), the Khun Hynniewtrep National Awakening Movement (KHNAM) and three independents. D.D. Lapang was confirmed as Chief Minister with Donkupar Roy of the UPD as Deputy Chief Minister.

Results

Elected Members

References 

Meghalaya
State Assembly elections in Meghalaya
2000s in Meghalaya